St. Thomas Aquinas Catholic High School is a Catholic secondary school located in Russell, Ontario, under the jurisdiction of the Catholic District School Board of Eastern Ontario. The school also enrolls students from nearby towns such as Embrun, Casselman, Chesterville, Winchester, Morewood and others.

The school has implemented a school uniform by McCarthy School Uniforms.

Construction of the school started in 2003, with the school opening in 2004. There have been several expansions since.

External link
 

Catholic secondary schools in Ontario
Educational institutions established in 2003
Russell, Ontario
2003 establishments in Ontario